Savan is one of the Grenadine islands which lie between the Caribbean islands of Saint Vincent and Grenada. Politically, it is part of the nation of Saint Vincent and the Grenadines.

References

Uninhabited islands of Saint Vincent and the Grenadines